The Cottonwood Ranch is an historic site near Studley in Valley Township, Sheridan County, Kansas, United States. The ranch is now preserved as a Kansas State Historic Site.

The ranch was built by Abraham Pratt, an Englishman who first came to the United States during the years of the Colorado Gold Rush.  After returning to England, he immigrated to Kansas with his sons John Fenton and Tom and settled in the Studley vicinity.  Beginning in 1885, the men built a one-room stone house with a sod roof and dirt floor.  After it proved inadequate for shelter from the winter conditions, it was re-roofed with wood, and it was expanded in later years.  Other buildings at the ranch included a sod stable, a sod-walled corral, and a wood-framed outbuilding with a toilet. A storage cistern was constructed to store water from a natural spring on the property.

In 1983, the ranch property was listed on the National Register of Historic Places as the John Fenton Pratt Ranch.

References

External links
Cottonwood Ranch State Historic Site, Kansas Historical Society.

Agricultural buildings and structures on the National Register of Historic Places in Kansas
English-American history
Historic house museums in Kansas
Kansas state historic sites
Museums in Sheridan County, Kansas
Ranches on the National Register of Historic Places
National Register of Historic Places in Sheridan County, Kansas
Ranches in Kansas